Nigel Patmore (born 4 September 1960) is a former field hockey player from Australia. He was the member of the winning Australian team in 1986 World Cup and 1983 Champions Trophy. He also was the member of team which ranked fourth in the Field Hockey tournament of 1984 Summer Olympics.

References

External links
 

1960 births
Living people
Australian male field hockey players
Olympic field hockey players of Australia
Field hockey players at the 1984 Summer Olympics